Rahmatabad Rural District is a rural district (dehestan) in Zarqan County, Fars Province, Iran. At the 2006 census, its population was 6,597, in 1,686 families.  The rural district has 12 villages.

References 

Rural Districts of Fars Province
Shiraz County